William Rowe (10 January 1892 – 3 September 1972) was an Australian cricketer. He played in 47 first-class matches for Queensland between 1912 and 1931.

See also
 List of Queensland first-class cricketers

References

External links
 

1892 births
1972 deaths
Australian cricketers
Queensland cricketers
Cricketers from Brisbane